Ashwamedham is a 1967 Indian Malayalam-language film, directed by A. Vincent and written by Thoppil Bhasi. It is based on Thoppil Bhasi's play of the same name. The film stars Sathyan, Sheela and Prem Nazir in lead roles along with Madhu and Sukumari in supporting roles. The film revolves around Sarojam (Sheela), who contracts leprosy. A sequel, Sarasayya, was released in 1971.

Plot

Cast 

Sheela as Sarojam
Sathyan as Dr. Thomas
Prem Nazir as Mohanan
Madhu as Sadanandan
Sukumari as Gely
Adoor Bhasi as Manthravaadi
P. J. Antony as Keshava Swami
T. R. Omana as Mohanan's Mother
Bahadoor as Health Visitor
GK Pillai as Mohanan's Father
Indira Thampi as Sarala
Kambissery Karunakaran as Kushtarogi
Junior Sheela
Santha Devi as Lakshmi

Soundtrack 
The music was composed by G. Devarajan and the lyrics were written by Vayalar Ramavarma.

References

External links 
 

1960s Malayalam-language films
1967 films
Films directed by A. Vincent
Indian films based on plays